Nationalist Canarian Platform (PCN) was an electoral alliance in the Canary Islands, formed by the Party of Gran Canaria (PGC), Independents of Fuerteventura (IF) and Lanzarote Independents Party (PIL) ahead of the 1995 Canarian election.

Member parties
Party of Gran Canaria (PGC)
Independents of Fuerteventura (IF)
Lanzarote Independents Party (PIL)

References

Political parties in the Canary Islands
Political parties established in 1995
Political parties disestablished in 1999
Defunct political party alliances in Spain